DHL MoonBox is a mementos box that will be going to the Moon in 2023 on Astrobotic Technology's Peregrine lunar lander. The DHL MoonBox is made by DHL. It contains 28 capsules all of which have been filled. It contains items from the USA, UK, Canada, Nepal, Germany and Belgium.  The 31 payloads on it are:

References

External links 
 Astrobotic - MoonBox

Message artifacts
Peregrine Payloads